Strange Conversation is an album by singer/songwriter Kris Delmhorst, released in 2006.

History
Multi-instrumentalist and songwriter Delmhorst takes on setting some works of famous poets to music along with her own original compositions. The lead off track is named after Italian composer Baldassare Galuppi. Inspired by and quoting heavily from the Robert Browning poem A Toccata of Galuppi's, Delmhorst reflects on the composers times and style:

"And the minor third so bitter, the six chord like a sigh,
suspension, solution, asking must we die, must we die must we die?
And the seventh says well fellas, life might not last, but we can try…"

Strange Conversations was recorded at the same time as Delmhorst's follow up CD, Shotgun Singer.

Reception

Critic Joe Viglione of Allmusic called Strange Conversation "an impressive and ambitious work that is evidence of the sophistication enveloping the Kris Delmhorst catalog and one hopes that these important musings get noticed beyond the cult that realizes something very special is happening here."

Track listing 
All songs by Kris Delmhorst unless noted.
"Galuppi Baldassare" – 4:15
"We'll Go No More A-Roving" (Byron, Delmhorst) – 3:04
"Light of the Light" – 4:34
"Since You Went Away" (Delmhorst, James Weldon Johnson, Olson) – 3:06
"Strange Conversation" – 3:36
"The Drop & The Dream" – 3:04
"Invisible Choir" – 3:44
"Pretty How Town" (e. e. cummings, Delmhorst) – 1:57
"Tavern" (Delmhorst, Edna St. Vincent Millay) – 3:42
"Water, Water" – 2:40
"Sea Fever" (Delmhorst, John Masefield) – 3:43
"Everything Is Music" – 3:55

Personnel
Kris Delmhorst – vocals, acoustic guitar, fiddle, piano, cello, background vocals
Kevin Barry – electric and acoustic guitar, lap steel guitar, dobro, piano, background vocals
Mark Chenevert – clarinet, tenor sax
Lorne Entress – drums, percussion, background vocals
Dave Harris – trombone, tuba
Paul Kochanski – double bass, background vocals
Mike Peipman – trumpet
Chris Rival – organ
Tom West – Hammond organ

Production
 Produced by Kris Delmhorst
 Engineered and mixed by Chris Rival
 Mastered by Dave McNair
 Photography by Megan Summers
Translation by Coleman Barks
Artwork and design by Brian Turner

References

External links
Official Kris Delmhorst website
Signature Sounds Recordings

2006 albums
Kris Delmhorst albums